Roberto César Itacaramby, commonly known as just Roberto César (born February 14, 1955), is a former association footballer who played forward; he played in several Brazilian Série A clubs. He was the top goal scorer of the 1979 Série A.

Career
Roberto César played four Série A games for Cruzeiro between 1974 and 1976, without scoring a goal, before moving to Operário-CG in 1976. He played 16 Série A games and scored eight goals for the Campo Grande club in 1977 and in 1978, before returning to Cruzeiro in 1978. Roberto César scored 26 goals in 56 Série A games between 1978 and 1981, and finished as the 1979 Série A top goal scorer with 12 goals. After leaving Cruzeiro, he defended Portuguesa in 1984 and in 1985, scoring a goal in ten Série A games, and Grêmio in 1985, in which he scored three goals in ten Série A games.

References

1955 births
Living people
Brazilian footballers
Cruzeiro Esporte Clube players
Operário Futebol Clube (MS) players
Associação Portuguesa de Desportos players
Grêmio Foot-Ball Porto Alegrense players
Association football forwards